Handalpur is a village of Sambhal in Moradabad district, Uttar Pradesh.This is a small village. Here are two temples in this village. One of them is of shiv and other one is of durga.
Here is a primary school. Here are mostly Jat. here two melas held in a year, on shivratri and krishnjanmastmi.
follow this link to map map of handalpur (hondal land)

Villages in Moradabad district